The XY Factor is an American documentary series that ran over 2000-2003 on the History Channel. It covered attitudes towards sex across various eras of history.

References

2000 American television series debuts
2003 American television series endings
2000s American documentary television series
English-language television shows
History (American TV channel) original programming